LaFlamme or Laflamme is a surname. Notable people with this surname include:

 Christian Laflamme (born 1976), Canadian professional ice hockey defenceman
  Robert LaFlamme, American (born 1961),  Author and Photographer
 David LaFlamme (born 1941), American virtuoso violinist
 Joseph-Clovis-Kemner Laflamme (1849–1910), Canadian Roman Catholic priest, academic and writer
 Léo Kemner Laflamme (1893–1989), (American-)Canadian lawyer and politician
 Lisa LaFlamme (born 1964), Canadian television journalist
 Napoléon Kemner Laflamme (1865–1929), Canadian lawyer and politician
 Ovide Laflamme (1925–1993), Canadian lawyer, judge and politician
 Paul LaFlamme, New Hampshire state representative
 Raymond Laflamme (born 1960), Canadian physicist
 Rodolphe Laflamme (1827–1893), French-Canadian lawyer, professor of law and politician

Toponyms 
 Réserve écologique J.-Clovis-Laflamme, located near Saint-Edwidge, Quebec, in Saguenay–Lac-Saint-Jean, in Quebec, in Canada.
 Laflamme River, a tributary of Bell River (watershed of James Bay, Matagami Lake and Nottaway River) flowing in municipality of James-Bay, in administrative region of Nord-du-Québec, in Québec, in Canada.

Others 
 Aurelie Laflamme's Diary (Le Journal d'Aurélie Laflamme), a series of novellas for teens written by India Desjardins and a 2010 film adaptation

French-language surnames